The Grabfeld is a region in Germany, on the border between Bavaria and Thuringia. It is situated southeast of the Rhön Mountains. Its highest elevation is 679 metres high in the little Gleichberge mountain range. The Grabfeld gave its name to the Bavarian district of Rhön-Grabfeld and the Thuringian municipality of Grabfeld. 

Geography of Bavaria
Regions of Thuringia